Chignik Airport  is a state-owned, public-use airport two nautical miles (3.7 km) northeast of the central business district of Chignik, a city in the Lake and Peninsula Borough of the U.S. state of Alaska.

As per Federal Aviation Administration records, this airport had 800 commercial passenger boardings (enplanements) in calendar year 2008, a decrease of 21% from the 1,017 enplanements in 2007. Chignik Airport is included in the FAA's National Plan of Integrated Airport Systems (2009–2013), which categorizes it as a general aviation facility.

Facilities and aircraft 
Chignik Airport has one runway designated 2/20 with a gravel surface measuring 2,600 by 60 feet (792 x 18 m). The airport is unattended. For the 12-month period ending January 31, 2008, the airport had 2,120 aircraft operations, an average of 176 per month: 67% air taxi and 33% general aviation.

Airlines and destinations

Statistics

See also 
 Chignik Bay Seaplane Base 
 Chignik Fisheries Airport 
 Chignik Lagoon Airport 
 Chignik Lake Airport

References

External links 
 Airport diagram for Chignik (AJC) (GIF). FAA, Alaska Region. 25 Dec 2003.

Airports in Lake and Peninsula Borough, Alaska